Victoria Frankenstein may refer to:

Victoria Frankenstein, lead character in Frankenstein (2007 film)
Victoria Frankenstein, a Marvel Comics character in the stories of Dreadknight and Frankenstein's Monster (Marvel Comics)